Howwood railway station is a railway station serving the village of Howwood, Renfrewshire, Scotland.

History 
The original Howwood station was opened on 21 July 1840 by the Glasgow, Paisley, Kilmarnock and Ayr Railway and was known as Howood. The station had a very short life and closed just over two weeks later on 11 August 1840. A new station called Howwood was opened on 1 December 1876, 200 metres south west of the original, and closed on 7 March 1955.

The current station opened on 12 March 2001, on the same site as the 1876 station. It has a 24-hour station car park with 30 spaces.

Services

2016 service pattern 
There is a half-hourly service at the station. Trains run from Ayr-Glasgow Central, calling at all stops between Glasgow and Ayr.

References

Notes

Sources

External links

 Video footage of Howwood Station

Railway stations in Renfrewshire
Former Glasgow and South Western Railway stations
Railway stations in Great Britain opened in 1840
Railway stations in Great Britain closed in 1840
Railway stations in Great Britain opened in 1876
Railway stations in Great Britain closed in 1955
Railway stations in Great Britain opened in 2001
Railway stations served by ScotRail
SPT railway stations